A superburial is similar to a mass grave, but is a term typically used by archaeologists to denote an area of dense burial activity without the negative connotations often associated with mass graves.  A superburial may also span a much longer time period than is typical for a mass grave, such as a cemetery in constant use for centuries.

List of superburials under current excavation (far from complete)
Valley of the Kings
Ban Non Wat

See also
 List of archaeological sites sorted by country

Archaeological features